Little House on the Prairie is an autobiographical children's novel by Laura Ingalls Wilder, published in 1935. It was the third novel published in the Little House series, continuing the story of the first, Little House in the Big Woods (1932), but not related to the second. Thus, it is sometimes called the second one in the series, or the second volume of "the Laura Years".

Plot summary 
The novel is about the months the Ingalls spent on the Kansas prairie around the town of Independence. Laura describes how her father built their one-room log house in Indian Territory, having heard that the government planned to open the territory to white settlers soon.

In contrast to Little House in the Big Woods, the Ingalls face difficulty and danger in this book. They all fall ill from malaria, which was ascribed to breathing the night air or eating watermelon. American Indians are a common sight for them, as their house was built in Osage territory, and Ma's open distrust of Indians contrasts with Laura's more childlike observations about those who live and ride nearby. They begin to congregate at the nearby river bottoms and their war cries unnerve the settlers, who worry they may be attacked, but an Osage chief who was friendly with Pa is able to avert the hostilities.

By the end of the novel, all the Ingalls' work is undone when word comes that U.S. soldiers are being sent to remove white settlers from Indian Territory. Pa decides to move his family away before they can be forced to leave.

Historical background
The Ingalls moved from Wisconsin to Kansas in 1868 (stopping for a while in Rothville, Missouri), and lived there between 1869 and 1870. Carrie was born there in August, and a few weeks after her birth, they were forced to leave the territory (however, in the novel, she is present during the move to Kansas). They moved back to Wisconsin, where they lived the next four years. In 1874 they started for Walnut Grove, Minnesota, stopping for a while in Lake City.

Although Wilder states that Charles had been told that the Kansas territory would soon be up for settlement, their homestead was on the Osage Indian reservation and Charles' information was incorrect. The Ingalls had no legal right to occupy their homestead, and once informed of their error, left the territory despite the fact that they had only just begun farming it. Several of their neighbors stayed and fought the decision.

As they were preparing to leave, the Ingalls received word from Wisconsin that the man who purchased their farm near Pepin had defaulted on the mortgage. Since they had to leave Kansas, they decided to go back to Wisconsin and moved back to the farm they had left two years earlier. So instead of heading to Minnesota as the series relates, they headed to Wisconsin and lived there again for a few years before heading west to Minnesota.

Reception
Virginia Kirkus had handled Wilder's debut novel Little House in the Big Woods for Harper & Brothers as its book editor from 1926 to 1932. In Kirkus Reviews, her semimonthly bulletin from 1933, she awarded this novel a starred review (as she did the next three sequels). "Good Americana – and a first rate tale. Personally, I liked it certainly as well, perhaps better than the other."

In 2012, the novel was ranked number 27 among all-time children's novels in a survey published by School Library Journal – the second of three Little House books in the Top 100.

Notes

References

External links

 
 Little House Books at HarperCollins Children's Books

Little House books
1935 American novels
Children's historical novels
Novels set in Kansas
Novels set in Minnesota
Novels set in the 1860s
Novels set in the 1870s
Harper & Brothers books
American novels adapted into television shows
1935 children's books